Sir Charles Vavasour, 1st Baronet, of Killingthorpe ( – 1644) was an English soldier who fought the insurgents in the Irish Rebellion of 1641 where he excelled at the Battle of Liscarroll in 1642 but was defeated in the Battle of Cloughleagh of the ensuing Irish Confederate Wars. After the cease-fire of September 1643 he was sent to England to fight the Parliamentarians in the First English Civil War, but his regiment mutinied and he resigned his commission, dying soon after in Oxford.

Birth, origins, and early life 
Charles was born the third but became the eldest surviving son of Sir Thomas Vavasour of Copmanthorpe, County York, and his wife Mary Dodges. He must not be confused with his younger brother who was to become Sir William Vavasour, 1st Baronet of Copmansthorpe, and would pursue a similar military career but rising to major general, outshining his brother.

Vavasour succeeded his father in 1620. He was created Baronet of Killingthorpe on 22 June 1636 but with a precedence of 29 June 1611. It seems that in his youth he fought in the Thirty Years' War in Germany.

Irish wars 
During the Irish Rebellion of 1641 Vavasour commanded one of the three English regiments that reinforced the army of Sir William St Leger in February or early March 1642. Vavasour landed in February with his regiment in Youghal on the Irish south coast. He also brought St Leger the royal declaration of 1 January 1642 in which the King denounced the rebels.

In March and April, Donough MacCarty, 2nd Viscount Muskerry and Maurice Roche, 8th Viscount Fermoy. with 4,000 men besieged St Leger in Cork City. On 13 April 1642 Vavasour fought under Murrough O'Brien, 6th Baron of Inchiquin, an Irish Protestant, in the sally that lifted the siege by driving the rebels from their base at Rochfordstown.

Next Vavasour commanded the foot at the Battle of Liscarrol on 3 September 1642, again under Inchiquin who was commander-in-chief and commanded the horse. and pursued the Irish when they finally fled. He was then appointed to succeed Lewis Boyle, 1st Viscount of Kinalmeaky, who had been killed at the battle, as governor of Bandon.

In the ensuing Irish Confederate Wars Vavasour was defeated on 4 June 1643 by James Tuchet, 3rd Earl of Castlehaven at the Battle of Cloughleagh and taken prisoner.

First English Civil War 
On 15 September 1643 James Butler, 1st Marquess of Ormond, the Lord Lieutenant of Ireland signed a ceasefire, called the Cessation, with the Irish Catholic Confederation. Ormond sent five regiments to England to fight the Parliamentarians in the First English Civil War. Vavasour with his regiment landed in October in Bristol. They became part of the army commanded by Ralph Hopton, 1st Baron Hopton, but the regiment mutinied and Vavasour resigned his commission. The regiment was pacified and Matthew Appleyard succeeded Vavasour as its colonel.

Death 
Sir Charles Vavasour died at Oxford unmarried in February 1644.

Notes and references

Notes

Citations

Sources 

 
  – 1642 to 1660
 
  – 1625 to 1649
 
  – 1642 to 1644
  – 1603 to 1860
  – Parliaments & Biographies (PDF downloadable from given URL)
 
  – (Preview)
 
  – History
  – (Preview)

1644 deaths
17th-century English soldiers
Vavasour family
Year of birth uncertain